Roger L. Sherman is an American politician, farmer and schoolteacher from Hodgdon, Maine. Sherman is a former Republican member of the Maine House of Representatives and Maine Senate. Sherman served in the Maine Legislature from 1998 to 2016.

Sherman graduated with a B.A. from the now-defunct Ricker College in Houlton, a master's degree in chemistry from the University of New Hampshire, and a Juris Doctor degree from the University of Maine School of Law. He was born, raised and lives in Hodgdon, Maine.

Sherman served as vice-chair of the rural caucus as a state representative. As a state senator, Sherman served on the Criminal Justice and Public Safety; Agriculture, Conservation and Forestry; and Judiciary committees, as well as the sub-committees on Elections, and Children and Families.

References

Year of birth missing (living people)
Living people
Republican Party Maine state senators
Republican Party members of the Maine House of Representatives
People from Hodgdon, Maine
Ricker College alumni
University of New Hampshire alumni
University of Maine School of Law alumni
Farmers from Maine
21st-century American politicians